René Pomeau (20 February 1917 in Beautiran – 26 February 2000 in Clamart) was an eminent French scholar of eighteenth-century French literature generally  recognised as one of the most expert authority on Voltaire  by the time of his death in 2000. His son is Yves Pomeau.

Biography 
René Pomeau was professor at the Sorbonne, member of the Académie des Sciences Morales et Politiques, Institut de France and ultimately president of the Société Littéraire de la France. His greatest achievements were the four large volumes, Voltaire en son temps, published by the Voltaire Foundation between 1985 and 1994.

Works 
 Voltaire en son temps, 1995, Voltaire Foundation
 La religion de Voltaire
 L'Âge classique 
 L'Europe des Lumières, cosmopolitisme et unité européenne au XVIIIe
 Laclos ou le paradoxe
 Avec Madame du Châtelet
 Beaumarchais ou la bizarre Destinée

Notes

External links 
 Obituary: René Pomeau, The Guardian, Tuesday 7 March 2000

1917 births
2000 deaths
Academic staff of the University of Paris
French philologists